The climate in Greece is predominantly Mediterranean. However, due to the country's geography, Greece has a wide range of micro-climates and local variations. The Greek mainland is extremely mountainous, making Greece one of the most mountainous countries in Europe. To the west of the Pindus mountain range, the climate is generally wetter and has some maritime features. The east of the Pindus mountain range is generally drier and windier in summer. The highest peak is Mount Olympus, . The northern areas of Greece have a transitional climate between the continental and the Mediterranean climate. There are mountainous areas that have an alpine climate.

Mediterranean climate
The climate of Greece can be divided into the following Mediterranean climate (Köppen climate classification: Cs) subtypes:

"True" Mediterranean 
According to the Climate Atlas of Greece which was published by the Hellenic National Meteorological Service (H.N.M.S) the Mediterranean climate (Köppen climate classification: Csa) is the predominant climate found in Greece. This climate occurs in the Aegean Islands, especially the Cyclades and the Dodecanese, southern and Evia, low-lying areas of Attica, the western, eastern and southern low-lying Peloponnese areas, and the low-lying areas of Crete. During the summer, the weather is most frequently sunny and dry, and any precipitation falls in the form of showers or thunderstorms from cumuliform clouds. The air is usually hot during the day and pleasantly warm at night, but there are some very windy days, especially in the Cyclades islands and around them. Heatwaves may occur, but they are usually quite mild at the coastal areas, where temperatures are moderated by the relatively cooler sea and the sea breeze. Winters are wet and any snow that falls does not last long, especially in the south-facing slopes. Rain in winter is often persistent: The west areas of this climate zone receive a relatively higher amount of precipitation.

Alpine Mediterranean
In this climate type (Köppen climate classification: Csc) with much lower temperatures, the winter is harsh with abundant snowfalls, while the summers are cool with frequent thunderstorms. This climate is to be found on high mountains, like in the Pindus and Rhodope mountains.

Transitional continental- Mediterranean
This climate has characteristics of both the continental and Mediterranean climate.

Semi-arid climate
According to the Climate Atlas of Greece published by the Hellenic National Meteorological Service (H.N.M.S) the semi-arid climate (Köppen climate classification: BS) is found in areas of Macedonia and Thessaly (cold semi-arid, Köppen: BSk) and also in areas of Attica such as Piraeus in the Athens Riviera (hot semi-arid, Köppen: BSh).

Temperature 
Abs. minimum temperature: , Ptolemaida.
Abs. maximum temperature: , Athens

The  recorded by minimum/maximum thermometers in Tatoi and Elefsina as reported by a communication of Athanasios D. Sarantopoulos is also the WMO record high temperature for Greece and Europe.
However, since Greece is generally a mountainous country, real average temperatures vary considerably from region to region.

Heatwaves
In 2021, the government officials announced that they are considering giving the heatwaves names that could help people better prepare for more extreme heat.

Precipitation 
According to the data of the network of meteorological stations which belong to the National Observatory of Athens, the lowest average annual precipitation in Greece is recorded in Schoinoussa with 222 mm (2013-2022) while the highest average annual precipitation in the country is recorded in Theodoriana with 2461 mm (2009-2022).

Local winds

Etesians
Probably the most well known local winds in Greece are the etesians (also known as meltemia). With their name notating their annual fluctuation (έτος (étos) means year in Greek), these winds may blow from May to October, with their highest frequency being recorded in July and August. They keep temperatures and diurnal temperature fluctuations in the Aegean sea lower than the respective ones found in the Ionian sea or mainland Greece.

Sunshine
According to the Climatic Atlas published by the Hellenic National Meteorological Service, Greece receives less than 1.700 hours of sunshine per year in mountainous areas of Epirus and more than 3.250 hours of sunshine per year in South Crete.

References

External links 
Hellenic National Meteorological Service
National Observatory of Athens

Network of online weather stations

 
Greece